Functional zoning or functional city zoning is a method used for dividing land use by its function. Typically, land use is divided in two ways, by its function and by its physical characteristics. An example of functional zoning would be an area that has designated zones based on a function such as an industrial zone, a recreational zone and a residential zone. An example of an area zoned by its physical characteristics is defined in terms of characteristics like development density, minimum lot size, and building coverage, placement and height.

Functional zoning tends to create or increase car dependency, while mixed-use zoning tends to enable walking, making it more sustainable. It has been criticized for causing the squandering of land, energy, and time.

References 

Zoning